Numidio Quadrato is a station on the Rome Metro. It is on Line A and is located in the Quadraro district of Rome, under the intersection of Via Tuscolana and Via Scribonio Curione. The station is named after Via Numidio Quadrato, a nearby road whose name changed in 1980.

Structure
The station features many mosaic art works as a part of Rome Metro art programs.

The platforms in this station are much larger than most stations on Line A. This is because it was originally planned to be a transfer station with Line D. This is no longer a possible situation as Line D has been rerouted to another part of Rome.

References

External links

Rome Metro Line A stations
Railway stations opened in 1980
1980 establishments in Italy
Rome Q. VIII Tuscolano
Railway stations in Italy opened in the 20th century